Marjorie Fulton (married name Marjorie Harrell; née Marjorie McAllister Fulton; December 28, 1909 — November 3, 1962) was an American concert violinist and music educator of distinction.

Career 
Fulton was born in Oklahoma City, where she began studying piano at age nine, in 1918.  She attended the Curtis Institute of Music and held fellowships at The Juilliard School, graduating with honors in 1935.  While at Curtis, Fulton met Mack Harrell who had studied violin at Oklahoma City University and was continuing violin studies at Curtis.  They married in 1935 in New York City, the same year that she received her graduate diploma from Juilliard. Mack Harrell flourished as a concert and operatic baritone, notably with the Metropolitan Opera, and Fulton continued to perform and teach.  One of their three children, Lynn Harrell, born in 1944, was an internationally renowned concert cellist.

Fulton had performed with many major groups around the world and had given concerts at The Town Hall (debut — 4 February 1953) and Carnegie Hall in New York City, and Jordan Hall in Boston (1936–1937).

As a violin teacher, Fulton taught privately in Boston (from 1936 to 1937), New York, and Dallas.  She had taught at the University of North Texas College of Music, beginning in 1958, and became an artist in residence there in 1960.  She also had taught at the Aspen Music Festival and School where her husband was director from 1954 until his death in 1960.

Death 
Fulton, while on the faculty at North Texas, died in Dallas, Texas, from injuries six days after a two-vehicle crash while traveling from Denton to Fort Worth with pianist Jean Mainous to perform a recital.  Two years earlier (1960), her husband, Mack Harrell had died of cancer.  Modernist composer Samuel Adler, a member of the composition faculty at North Texas in 1962, dedicated his 1962 composition, Elegy for Strings, to Mrs. Marjorie Fulton Harrell.  The work was performed twice in November 1962 by the Dallas Symphony Orchestra, Donald Johanos conducting.

References 

American classical violinists
1909 births
1962 deaths
Texas classical music
University of North Texas College of Music faculty
Musicians from Oklahoma City
Curtis Institute of Music alumni
Juilliard School alumni
Road incident deaths in Texas
20th-century classical violinists
Women classical violinists
20th-century women musicians
Women music educators
20th-century American violinists